The Red Line or Orient Line is one of the four lines of the Lisbon Metro.

Stations

Frequency

Chronology

19 May 1998: Opening of the red line with the following stations: Alameda, Olaias, Bela Vista, Chelas and Oriente.
18 July 1998: Opening of the Cabo Ruivo station.
7 November 1998: Opening of the Olivais station.
29 August 2009: Opening of the Saldanha and São Sebastião stations. Line route: São Sebastião - Oriente.
17 July 2012: Opening of the Moscavide, Encarnação and Aeroporto stations. Line route: São Sebastião - Aeroporto.

See also
 List of Lisbon metro stations

References

External links

Lisbon Metro lines
Railway lines opened in 1998

Em 19 De Dezembro De 2001 Era Para Concretizar Uma Coversão Toda A Linha Vermelha Do Metro De Lisboa Para Rede Mundial De Transportes Mundiais Expressos Comboios Parte De Linha Circula Em Todo Sistema Passando Para A Rede RodoFerroviária Para Todo Os Planetas E Para Todo O Lado.